The surname Gilbertson has several origins. Sometimes it is derived from the personal name Gilbert. In other cases it is an Americanization of the Norwegian surname Gilbertsen, or some other Scandinavian cognate.

People with the surname
 Ashley Gilbertson (b. 1978), Australian, photographer
 Charlotte Gilbertson (1922–2014), American painter and print maker
 David Gilbertson (b. 1949), American, chief justice of the South Dakota Supreme Court
 Emil G. Gilbertson (1870–1949). American politician
 Eric R. Gilbertson, American, President of Saginaw Valley State University
 Gary Gilbertson, American, music composer for Atari
 Julius C. Gilbertson (1875–1933), American politician and jurist 
 Keith Gilbertson (b. 1948), American, collegiate head football coach
 Kevin Gilbertson, American web developer, inventor of tinyURL
 Larry D. Gilbertson (1917–1986), American politician
 Lewis Gilbertson (1814–1896), Welsh clergyman and academic
 Lucas Gilbertsonpointless, Canadian voice actor
 Paul Gilbertson (b. 1962), English, first guitarist of the British band James
 Stan Gilbertson (b. 1944), American ice hockey player
 Tim Gilbertson (b. 1987), Canadian singer/songwriter

References

See also
 Gilbert (given name)
 Gibson (surname)

Patronymic surnames
Surnames from given names